Marzuki Elias  is a Singaporean footballer who played as a left-back for the Singapore national team in the 1984 Asian Cup.

He used to play for Farrer Park United.

References

Stats

Year of birth missing (living people)
Living people
Singaporean footballers
Singapore international footballers
1984 AFC Asian Cup players
Southeast Asian Games silver medalists for Singapore
Southeast Asian Games medalists in football
Association football defenders
Competitors at the 1981 Southeast Asian Games